Goodfather or Good Father or variation, may refer to:

People
 a father who is good

Persons
 The Goodfather, (born 1961, as Charles Wright), American professional wrestler
 Peter Coudrin (1768–1837; born Pierre Coudrin; nicknamed "The Good Father") Roman Catholic missionary
 Jean-Marie-Rodrigue Villeneuve (1883–1947; nicknamed "Good Father") Roman Catholic cardinal

Other uses
 The Good Father (novel), a novel by Peter Prince
 The Good Father (film), a 1985 UK film
 "The Good Father" (Life on Mars), series 1 episode 8 of UK TV show Life on Mars
 Good Father Bar, a fictional bar from the TV sitcom Come Home Love: Lo and Behold
 "Good Father" (song), a 2012 single by Vybz Kartel

See also

 Pacho, a town in Cundinamarca, Columbia
 Le Bon Père, an 18th-century stage comedy
 Abbà Pater (album), a 1999 devotional album by Pope John Paul II
 "Good Good Father" (song), a 2015 single by Chris Tomlin off his 2016 album Never Lose Sight
 The Good Mother (disambiguation)
 
 
 Good (disambiguation)
 Father (disambiguation)
 Godfather (disambiguation)